Cassegrain may refer to
 Cassegrain reflector, a design used in telescopes
 Cassegrain antenna, a type of parabolic antenna
 Cassegrain (crater), on the Moon
 a Belgian canned vegetables producer now part of Bonduelle S.A.
People :
 Guillaume Cassegrain, a French sculptor
 Giovanni Cassegrain, a French sculptor
 Jean Cassegrain, a French businessman, founder of Longchamp in 1948
 Laurent Cassegrain, a Catholic priest and teacher and probably the inventor of the Cassegrain Reflector